"Vindicated" is a song by American rock band Dashboard Confessional. It was written by Chris Carrabba with production from Don Gilmore and Gil Norton. The song was released on May 31, 2004 as the lead single from the soundtrack of the film Spider-Man 2. The song was included on Dashboard Confessional's fourth studio album, Dusk and Summer (2006) as a bonus track on some pressings and on deluxe edition versions. Played over the film's end credits, "Vindicated" is the theme for the film.

History
Initially, a song titled "I Need a Sure Thing" was to be used on the Spider-Man 2 soundtrack; but, after having received a special screening of the film, Carrabba penned "Vindicated" in 10 minutes, inspired by and reflecting the theme of the film.

"I Need a Sure Thing" has since then been performed during the Dusk and Summer Tour but not thereafter.

Reception
"Vindicated" was released to radio on June 1, 2004. "Vindicated" received significant airplay on US alternative rock radio stations in late 2004, peaking at #2 on Billboards Alternative Songs chart. It was held off from the #1 spot by Three Days Grace's "Just Like You".

Track listingUK maxi single'''
"Vindicated" – 3:20
"The Warmth of the Sand" – 4:17
"Hands Down" – 3:07
Track 3 taken from the So Impossible'' EP.

Music video
Directed by Nigel Dick, the music video, through the view of an individual reading a comic book, features the band performing the song in Doctor Octopus' hideout interspersed with scenes from the film.

Chart history

References

2004 singles
Dashboard Confessional songs
Music videos directed by Nigel Dick
Songs written for films
Songs written by Chris Carrabba
2004 songs
Vagrant Records singles
Interscope Records singles
Song recordings produced by Gil Norton
Spider-Man (2002 film series)
Songs from Spider-Man films